Myrmecina is a genus of ants in the subfamily Myrmicinae. It contains 53 species distributed in North America, Europe, northern Africa, India east, Korea, Japan and Australia.

Species

Myrmecina alpina Shattuck, 2009
Myrmecina amamiana Terayama, 1996
Myrmecina americana Emery, 1895
Myrmecina atlantis Santschi, 1939
Myrmecina australis Wheeler & Wheeler, 1973
Myrmecina bandarensis Forel, 1913
Myrmecina bawai Punnath, Karunakaran, Dharma, 2021
Myrmecina brevicornis Emery, 1897
Myrmecina butteli Forel, 1913
Myrmecina cacabau Mann, 1921
Myrmecina curtisi Donisthorpe, 1949
Myrmecina curvispina Zhou, Huang & Ma, 2008
Myrmecina difficulta Shattuck, 2009
Myrmecina eruga Shattuck, 2009
Myrmecina flava Terayama, 1985
Myrmecina graminicola (Latreille, 1802)
Myrmecina guangxiensis Zhou, 2001
Myrmecina hamula Zhou, Huang & Ma, 2008
Myrmecina harrisoni Brown, 1967
Myrmecina inaequala Shattuck, 2009
Myrmecina kaigong Terayama, 2009
Myrmecina magnificens Wong & Guénard, 2016
Myrmecina mandibularis Viehmeyer, 1914
Myrmecina mellonii Rigato, 1999
Myrmecina modesta Mann, 1919
Myrmecina nesaea Wheeler, 1924
Myrmecina nipponica Wheeler, 1906
Myrmecina opaciventris Emery, 1897
Myrmecina pauca Huang, Huang & Zhou, 2008
Myrmecina pilicornis Smith, 1858
Myrmecina polita Emery, 1897
Myrmecina pumila Shattuck, 2009
Myrmecina punctata Emery, 1897
Myrmecina raviwonghei Jaitrong, Samung, Waengsothorn & Okido, 2019
Myrmecina reticulata Punnath, Karunakaran, Dharma, 2021
Myrmecina rugosa Forel, 1902
Myrmecina ryukyuensis Terayama, 1996
Myrmecina sauteri Forel, 1912
Myrmecina semipolita Forel, 1905
Myrmecina sicula André, 1882
Myrmecina silvalaeva Shattuck, 2009
Myrmecina silvampla Shattuck, 2009
Myrmecina silvangula Shattuck, 2009
Myrmecina silvarugosa Shattuck, 2009
Myrmecina silvatransversa Shattuck, 2009
Myrmecina sinensis Wheeler, 1921
Myrmecina striata Emery, 1889
Myrmecina strigis Lin & Wu, 1998
Myrmecina sulcata Emery, 1887
Myrmecina taiwana Terayama, 1985
Myrmecina transversa Emery, 1897
Myrmecina undulata Emery, 1900
Myrmecina urbanii Tiwari, 1994
Myrmecina vidyae Tiwari, 1994
Myrmecina wesselensis Shattuck, 2009

References

External links

Myrmicinae
Ant genera